Epaphius acco is a species of ground beetle in the family Carabidae. It is native to Japan.

References

Trechinae